The Battle of Beth Horon or Battle with Seron was fought at some point between Spring 166 BC to Spring 165 BC during the Maccabean Revolt between Judean rebels led by Judas Maccabeus (Judah Maccabee) and an army of the Seleucid Empire under the command of Seron, a commander of the Syrian army.  Beth-Horon, or Bethoron, was a strategic mountain pass leading from the coastal plain to the Judean hill country.  Utilizing guerrilla warfare tactics, the Maccabee rebels ambushed the passing Seleucid force from the pass, pursuing the surprised and fleeing remnants into the plain.

The Jewish army had earlier won a battle at the ascent of Lebonah against the Seleucid General Apollonius.  Another force was soon sent against the Maccabees, which led to the Battle of Emmaus.

Primary sources
The battle's only contemporaneous record is in the First Book of Maccabees.  According to it:

The historian Josephus mentions the battle briefly in Antiquities of the Jews, but seems to largely be a paraphrase of the 1 Maccabees version.  Josephus's account differs in that adds is that he claims that Seron was killed outright, as well as referring to him as a general (strategos) rather than a commander.  Historian Bezalel Bar-Kochva believes that Josephus misread 1 Maccabees on the matter of Seron's fate; 1 Maccabees says that Seron was "defeated" in the sense of his army losing the battle, but he speculated Josephus read it more literally as Seron being defeated as in "slain".

Analysis
The Beth Horon pass in the era was exceptionally narrow; according to a baraita tale: "Two camels climbed Beth Horon Ascent and met each other.  If both were going up together both would fall; if one after the other, they would both go up."  Nevertheless, it was still part of the main road from Jerusalem to the west during the era, as other routes involved even greater difficulties.  This makes it plausible as a spot for a small force to inflict major damage, as coordination among a surprised procession would be difficult, and superior numbers would count for little.

Judas's speeches and prayers in the book of 1 Maccabees are best seen as free compositions of the historian, not actual transcriptions, in the style of Hellenistic historians to essentially invent or rewrite such dialogue to be more literary.  The speech described before this battle does not particularly fit the situation of preparing for an ambush.  In the narrow terrain of the mountain ascent, the ambush would work better with only a small force anyway, with less risk of being spotted; it would be part of the plan rather than an ominous sign that indicated divine favor was needed to win the battle.

The book of 1 Maccabees occasionally uses archaic phrasings to present the deeds of the Hasmoneans as similar or equivalent to those of earlier heroes of Jewish Scripture.  The defeated Seleucid force retreats to the "land of the Philistines", but the Philistines were no longer a polity in the Hellenistic era.  Rather, it is a poetic reference to eparchy of Paralia on Judea's coastal plain to the west of Beth Horon, which in this era only had a Jewish minority and was friendly to the Greeks.

The precise date of the battle is not known, but is likely between 166–165 BC.  Mattathias's death is recorded as happening in the 146th year of the Ancient Macedonian calendar of the count used in Babylon & Judea, the equivalent to between Spring 166 BC to Spring 165 BC of the Gregorian calendar, and the structure of the narrative implies that Mattathias was already dead by the time the battle with Seron was fought.Bar-Kochva 1989, p. 472

Bar-Kochva suspects that the author of 1 Maccabees was not an eyewitness to this battle, although was able to interview someone who was.  He thinks that the description is basically accurate, although the author inflated the number of enemy soldiers as well as Seron's rank in the army to make the victory seem more impressive.  For this early stage of the revolt, it is more plausible that the Maccabees ambushed a smaller detachment of soldiers rather than attacking a huge army.  The claim that "terror" befell the Gentiles in their vicinity as a result of the victory against Seron seems somewhat overblown; later events in the text would show that they were not so afraid as to avoid antagonizing the Maccabees.  The non-Jewish Idumeans, Samaritans, and Greek residents of coastal towns would go on to cause quite a bit of trouble for the Maccabees as the Maccabean Revolt proceeded, forcing Judas and his army to protect Jews in the outlying areas and escort them to Judea as refugees during the campaigns of 163 BC.    

Nothing is known of Seron other than his name and that he commanded the army.  The name "Seron" might possibly be of Thracian origin, but the presumed translation of 1 Maccabees from Hebrew to Greek may have distorted the word.  The identity of the "godless" allies of Seron is not entirely clear either; possibilities include outlying Samaritans or Ammonites hostile to the Jews, Thracian mercenaries similar to Seron himself (if he really was Thracian), and Hellenized Jews who had been recruited as soldiers by the Seleucid government.

Notes

References

External links
 , Chapter 7
 , a much earlier battle won by Joshua at Beth Horon's mountain pass

166 BC
Beth Horon 166 BC
2nd century BC in the Seleucid Empire